Henri Dirickx (correctly spelled Diricx) (7 July 1927 – 26 June 2018) was a Belgian international footballer, who played as a defender. Dirickx was the last surviving member of Belgium's 1954 World Cup squad.

Career
Born in Duffel, Dirickx played club football for Union Saint-Gilloise, Racing Jette and Ixelles. He earned a total of 30 caps for Belgium between 1952 and 1960, and participated at the 1954 FIFA World Cup. Dirickx died on 26 June 2018, eleven days shy of his 91st birthday.

References

External links
 

1927 births
2018 deaths
Belgian footballers
Belgium international footballers
1954 FIFA World Cup players
Association football defenders
Royale Union Saint-Gilloise players
Racing Jet Wavre players
People from Duffel
Footballers from Antwerp Province